Mycobacterium farcinogenes is a species of the phylum Actinomycetota (Gram-positive bacteria with high guanine and cytosine content, one of the dominant phyla of all bacteria), belonging to the genus Mycobacterium.

Although slow-growing, it is similar to fast-growing species, and is usually classified with them.

Description
Gram-positive, nonmotile and strongly acid-fast rods. Short or long filaments, bent and branched, in clumps or tangled, lacy network.

Colony characteristics
Rough, yellow and convoluted colonies. Firmly adherent to medium and surrounded by an iridescent halo.

Physiology
Slow growth after 15–20 days on Löwenstein-Jensen medium.

Differential characteristics
On the basis of characteristic lipids this species belongs to the genus Mycobacterium and not to the genus Nocardia.
DNA homology to the closely related species Mycobacterium senegalense. Both species, share an identical 5' 16S rDNA sequence.  However, the ITS sequences are different.

Pathogenesis
Causes farcy in African cattle.
Distinctive pathogenicity for guinea pigs: on subcutaneous inoculation, M. farcinogenes produces draining and slow healing abscesses after 8 days.

Type strain
First isolated from lesions of farcy in African bovines (Chad).
Strain IEMVT 75 = ATCC 35753 = CCUG 21047 = DSM 43637 = NCTC 10955.

References

External links
Type strain of Mycobacterium farcinogenes at BacDive -  the Bacterial Diversity Metadatabase

Acid-fast bacilli
farcinogenes
Bacteria described in 1973